Bill Oliver (born 1939) is an American football player.

Bill Oliver may also refer to:

Bill Oliver (politician), Canadian politician
Bill Oliver (snooker player) (born 1948), English snooker player

See also
William Oliver (disambiguation), a disambiguation page for "Bill Oliver"